The 2016 Ningbo Challenger was a professional tennis tournament played on hard courts. It was the fourth edition of the tournament (for men) and part of the 2016 ATP Challenger Tour. It took place in Ningbo, China.

Singles  entrants

Seeds 

1 Rankings are as of 10 October 2016.

Other entrants 
The following players received wildcards into the singles main draw:
  Zhang Ze
  Wu Yibing
  Sun Fajing
  Wang Chuhan

The following players received entry from the qualifying draw:
  Jimmy Wang
  Shuichi Sekiguchi
  Sadio Doumbia
  Yannick Hanfmann

The following player entered as a lucky loser:
  Cheong-eui Kim

Champions

Singles 

  Yen-hsun Lu def.  Hiroki Moriya, 6–3, 6–1.

Doubles 

  Jonathan Eysseric /  Sergiy Stakhovsky def.  Stefan Kozlov /  Akira Santillan, 6–4, 7–6(7–4).

References

2016 ATP Challenger Tour
2016 in Chinese tennis